Sidney Sussex College (referred to informally as "Sidney") is a constituent college of the University of Cambridge in England. The College was founded in 1596 under the terms of the will of Frances Sidney, Countess of Sussex (1531–1589), wife of Thomas Radclyffe, 3rd Earl of Sussex, and named after its foundress. It was from its inception an avowedly Protestant foundation; "some good and godlie moniment for the mainteynance of good learninge". In her will, Lady Frances Sidney left the sum of £5,000 together with some plate to found a new College at Cambridge University "to be called the Lady Frances Sidney Sussex College". Her executors Sir John Harington and Henry Grey, 6th Earl of Kent, supervised by Archbishop John Whitgift, founded the College seven years after her death.

History
While the College's geographic size has changed little since 1596, an additional range was added to the original E-shaped buildings in the early 17th century and the appearance of the whole College was changed significantly in the 1820s and 1830s, under the leadership of the Master at the time, William Chafy. By the early 19th century, the buildings' original red brick was unfashionable and the hall range was suffering serious structural problems. The opening up of coal mines on estates left to the College in the 18th century provided extra funds which were to be devoted to providing a new mathematical library and accommodation for Mathematical Exhibitioners. As a result, the exterior brick was covered with a layer of cement, the existing buildings were heightened slightly, and the architectural effect was also heightened, under the supervision of Sir Jeffry Wyatville.

In the late nineteenth century, the College's finances received a further boost from the development of the resort of Cleethorpes on College land on the Lincolnshire coast that was purchased in 1616, following a bequest for the benefit of scholars and fellows by Peter Blundell, a merchant from Tiverton, Devon. A new wing (Cloister Court) added in 1891, to the designs of John Loughborough Pearson, is stylistically richer than the original buildings and has stone staircases whereas the stairs in the older buildings are made of timber.

In the early twentieth century, a High Church group among the Fellows were instrumental in the rebuilding and enlargement of the chapel, which was provided with a richly carved interior in late seventeenth-century style, designed by T. H. Lyon, and somewhat at odds with the College's original Puritan ethos.

21st century
The hereditary visitor of the college remains the Viscounts De L'Isle ex officio. The current visitor is Philip Sidney, 2nd Viscount De L'Isle. Sidney Sussex, Magdalene College, Cambridge and Jesus College, Oxford are the only three Oxbridge colleges that continue to prescribe by statute visitations held by hereditary peers.

Academic profile 
Sidney Sussex is recognised as one of the smaller Cambridge colleges. The student body consists of roughly 380 undergraduate students and 250 postgraduates.

Academically, Sidney Sussex has tended towards a mid-table position in the informal Tompkins Table. It is known for the high standard of pastoral support from the Tutorial team, and a sense of mutual support from students doing the same subject.

The College ranks fourth highest among Cambridge Colleges in Nobel Prizes won by alumni.

Buildings and grounds 
Sidney sits on the site of Cambridge’s Franciscan friary, built in the middle of the 13th century and dissolved in the 1530s. Artefacts of the site’s past lay beneath the foundations of the college buildings.

The oldest parts of the College are the two main courts which stand either side of the Porters’ Lodge, Chapel Court and Hall Court.

Chapel Court 
This court incorporates a number of buildings that house offices, the Junior Common Room (JCR) and even a number of students.

The Chapel, for which this court is named, has gone through many forms over the years. The current building was rebuilt in the 18th century, and has been extended a number of times in subsequent centuries. The exterior was entirely remodelled in 1833 to match the Gothic style of the rest of the buildings.

The richly carved interior of the Chapel was installed in the early 20th century to suit the High Church tastes of a group of College Fellows.

The Chapel is open throughout the day as a space for the College community, regardless of faith or background.

Hall Court 
Like Chapel Court, Hall Court is another bright space enclosed by a range of Gothic buildings incorporating the Master’s Lodge, Buttery and the new Kitchen buildings, but the Court’s name comes from the College Dining Hall. The hall itself was heavily refitted in the mid-eighteenth century in the Italian Palladian style. It features heavily decorated plasterwork, pillars, and an elaborate rococo ceiling with a centrepiece of scrolls and acanthus foliage. A grand portrait of the College’s foundress, Lady Frances Sidney, Countess of Sussex, watches over the high table.

The hall is used for a whole range of functions for undergraduates, postgraduates, alumni and Fellows, it is used to meet and socialise, and to try some of the College’s award-winning food.

Cloister Court 
Added in 1891 and designed in the Gothic revival style, these buildings call back to the Franciscan roots of the site.

The buildings house a number of student rooms, and the gardens and lawn are popular spaces for students and Fellows to relax and enjoy the peace. It is also here where a number of medieval graves were uncovered.

Chapel and music 

The old chapel, built by James Essex in the 1770s, was very small at 20 by 30 feet. The old bell, bought from Pembroke Hall in 1707 and recast in 1739, was retained until 1930 when it was replaced with a new one. The work to the new chapel was completed in 1923. The antechapel now contains wall memorials to the dead of the two world wars and to three masters, Parris, Elliston and Chafy. The presence of Oliver Cromwell's head buried somewhere nearby is marked by a tablet installed in 1960.

The Choir of Sidney Sussex College, Cambridge is made up of six to eight sopranos, six altos (male and female), six tenors, three baritones, and three basses. During term-time the Choir has a regular commitment in the Chapel to Choral Evensong on Fridays and Sundays and Latin Choral Vespers on Wednesdays.

A number of choral scholarships are available for members of the Sidney Choir. In addition to singing Evensong in the Chapel, the Choir has made some acclaimed recordings and tours regularly in the UK and overseas.

The Choir was nominated for a 2013 Gramophone Award in recognition of their disc of the music of Thomas Weelkes.

Music lovers can attend the concerts and recitals organised by the Sidney Sussex College Music Society, or join a number of instrumental and vocal ensembles.

The Sidney Chapel includes a Steinway grand piano, a harpsichord, a chamber organ and a Flentrop organ.

Student life

Student societies
Sidney has a range on offer including many sports clubs and a variety of subject-based societies that bring the whole subject community together. Students are very welcome to set up a new club or society at any time.

SSCSU (Sidney Sussex College Students' Union) represents undergraduates at Sidney, whether through socials or broader student politics. The Middle Common Room (MCR) is Sidney's friendly and outgoing postgraduate community, and consists of all the PhD, MPhil, Part III, and LLM students.

Boat Club 

Founded in 1837, the club has spent most of its time in the 2nd division of the Lent and May Bumps, with brief times spent in the 1st division. Being a small College, the club has never had the consistency to rise to take a headship of either event, and has been as high as 6th in the Lent Bumps in 1913, and 11th in the May Bumps in 1923.

A women's crew first appeared in 1978 and has spent most of its time in the lower half of the 1st division in both the Lent and May Bumps, but recently has fallen to the middle of the 2nd division of both the Lent and May Bumps.

In Lent Bumps 2020, Sidney Sussex were the winners of the Marconi Cup, making them the highest performing of any boat club overall. The Women's second boat were winners of blades, bumping a total of five times.

Confraternitas Historica 
The Confraternitas Historica, or Confraternitas Historica Dominae Franciscae Comitis Sussexiae, is the history society of Sidney Sussex College and is reputed to be the longest-running student history society in Europe, having existed since 1910. In fact, no meetings were held from 1914 to 1919 but since, during the First World War, "the University itself almost ceased to function ... the hiatus of 1914–19 is not counted as a break in the continuity of the society". The Latin name of the society reflects the tastes of Jack Reynolds, the High Church Fellow who presided over its creation, who also "endowed the Society with an elaborate Latin initiation ceremony". Similarly, rather than being led by a President, the student in charge of the society is instead 'Princeps'. Other society roles include the 'Magister,' 'Tribune,' 'Pontifex Maximus,' and 'Comes'. Furthermore, during society meetings all attendees are referred to in an egalitarian, though still Latinate, manner. Regardless of academic standing or title, all attendees are given the title of 'soror' (sister) or 'frater' (brother).

University Challenge

In the television show University Challenge, Sidney Sussex had a winning team in 1971 and 1978–79. The 1978 team, comprising John Gilmore, John Adams, David Lidington, and Nick Graham, went on to win the "Champion of Champions" University Challenge reunion competition in 2002. The College last appeared on the television show in 2018.

May Ball

It is known for producing a well-regarded May Ball for a smaller college. Notably, students created an artificial lake and canal in 2010, when the ball had a Venetian theme, to enable punting at the landlocked college. Recent themes have included 'Light' (2014) and 'Beyond' (2016).

As with many of the smaller colleges, Sidney Sussex does not run a May Ball every year, instead running a biennial May Ball, on even-numbered years. On odd-numbered years, the College previously hosted an arts festival, which welcomed anyone in Cambridge to attend. Notable guest speakers at the Sidney Arts Festival have included Stephen Fry, in 2015. However, in 2017 it was decided instead to hold a June Event. June Events are similar to a May Ball, but are smaller, usually with a lower ticket price, and shorter running time.

A Song of Sidney Sussex 
At the beginning of the 20th century, E.H. Griffiths wrote a ten verse song dedicated to Sidney Sussex. Each verse systematically identifies, then dismisses other Cambridge colleges for their faults, before settling on Sidney as the best college of all. The chorus exhorts the audience:

'Go travel round the town, my friend, whichever way you please,
From Downing up to Trinity, from Peterhouse to Caius:
Then seek a little College just beside a busy street,
Its name is Sidney Sussex, and you'll find it Bad to Beat.'

People associated with the College 

Former members of the College include the political and military leader Oliver Cromwell, who was among the first students,  although he never graduated, dropping out after his father became ill. Oliver Cromwell's head was interred in 1960 in a secret location near the antechapel.

Other former College members include early historian Thomas Fuller; historical writer Thomas Rymer; the 17th-century poet and dramatist Thomas May; and Dean of Sidney Sussex College and later Bishop Robert Machray.

Another famous alumnus was the theologian and moral philosopher William Wollaston who wrote The Religion of Nature Delineated (1724). Notable legal alumni include Antônio Augusto Cançado Trindade (judge on the International Court of Justice from 2009 until his death in 2022).

Politicians 
Notable politicians to have attended the College include the civil servant Sir Basil Engholm; and the former Foreign Secretary and leader of the Social Democratic Party Lord Owen. Former students also include Chris Grayling; David Lidington; Rebecca Evans, and the late Brian Lenihan, former Minister of Finance in the Republic of Ireland.

Scientists 
The College's strong tradition in the sciences is seen by the association of the Nobel Prize–winning physicists Cecil Frank Powell and C. T. R. Wilson, 1997 Nobel Prize in Chemistry recipient John E. Walker and the 2002 Nobel prize in Chemistry recipient Alan MacDiarmid. Sir Benjamin Lockspeiser, the first president of CERN was also an undergraduate at the College, along with psychiatrist W. Ross Ashby. Robert McCance Professor of Experimental Medicine, played a leading part in wartime rationing and 1940s government nutrition efforts. Professor Dame Ann Dowling has been a Fellow since 1977 and is the President of the Royal Academy of Engineering. The inaugural recipient of the Rosalind Franklin award Professor Sue Gibson was an undergraduate at the college. The "father of radio astronomy in Australia" Joe Pawsey obtained his PhD at Sidney Sussex in 1935.

Bletchley Park codebreakers 
Eleven members of the College worked at Bletchley Park during World War Two. They were Gordon Welchman, a Sidney Research Fellow in Mathematics who recruited many of them, John Herivel, Asa Briggs, Paul Coales, Malcolm Chamberlain, Edward Dudley Smith, John Manisty, Jim Passant, David Rees, Howard Smith (later head of MI5) and Leslie Yoxall (famous for his work in Hut 8 on breaking the German naval officers' code).

Artists and popular figures 
More recently alumni include best-selling author, broadcaster and Associate Editor of The Observer newspaper Andrew Rawnsley; former technical director of the Mercedes-Benz Formula One team Paddy Lowe; television host known primarily for her role on the game show Countdown Carol Vorderman and the comedian Alex Horne. Also, the Hollywood director John Madden known for the Academy Award-winning Shakespeare in Love, and professor and writer John Fraser.

Musical alumni include Al Doyle (1998) and Felix Martin (1999) of the electronic band Hot Chip. In 2010, American composer Eric Whitacre was named Visiting Fellow and Composer-in-Residence.

Sherlock Holmes 
Author Dorothy L. Sayers suggested that, given details in two of the stories, the fictional character Sherlock Holmes must have been at Cambridge rather than Oxford and that "of all the Cambridge Colleges, Sidney Sussex (College) perhaps offered the greatest number of advantages to a man in Holmes's position and, in default of more exact information, we may tentatively place him there".

List of alumni

See also
List of non-ecclesiastical works by J. L. Pearson

References

External links

Sidney Sussex College official website
 Confraternitas Historica

 
1596 establishments in England
Colleges of the University of Cambridge
Educational institutions established in the 1590s
Grade I listed buildings in Cambridge
Grade I listed educational buildings
J. L. Pearson buildings